At least two ships of the Hellenic Navy have borne the name Leon ("lion"):

  an  acquired in 1912 and sunk in 1941.
  a  launched in 1943 as USS Eldridge she was transferred to Greece in 1951 and renamed. She was scrapped in 1999.

Hellenic Navy ship names